Pyotr Bochkaryov (born November 3, 1967) is a retired Russian pole vaulter. He won the European Indoor Championships twice, setting an indoor personal best in 1994 with 5.90 metres. This remained the championship record until Renaud Lavillenie cleared 6.03 m in 2011. He placed 5th at the 1996 Summer Olympics with a jump of 5.86 m, his best outdoor result apart from a 5.90 m jump in a city square competition at Karlskrona.

Achievements

References

External links
Sports Reference
European Indoor Championships

1967 births
Living people
Russian male pole vaulters
Soviet male pole vaulters
Olympic athletes of Russia
Athletes (track and field) at the 1996 Summer Olympics
Universiade medalists in athletics (track and field)
Universiade bronze medalists for the Soviet Union
Medalists at the 1991 Summer Universiade